Deep Water is an Australian crime drama series screened on SBS from 5 October 2016. This four-part miniseries is a Blackfella Films' production, directed by Shawn Seet with Director of Photography Bruce Young.

The drama is based on the historical, unsolved hate murders of possibly 30 to 80 gay men in Sydney's eastern suburbs and beaches in the 1980s and '90s. SBS broadcast a documentary of these events, Deep Water: The Real Story (2016), in conjunction with the miniseries.

Plot
Detectives Tori Lustigman (Yael Stone) and Nick Manning (Noah Taylor) are assigned a brutal murder case in Bondi. They begin to uncover mounting evidence to suggest the killing is connected to a spate of unexplained deaths, "suicides", and disappearances of gay men throughout the 1980s and 1990s. Haunted by the disappearance of her teenage brother, Tori is fascinated by the case and soon becomes fixated on it. When more ritualistic murders occur that have the same bizarre signature, Tori and Nick put their relationships, their careers and lives on the line to reveal the truth.

Cast
 Yael Stone as Tori Lustigman
 Noah Taylor as Nick Manning
 William McInnes as Chief Inspector Peel 
 Danielle Cormack as Brenda MacIntosh
 Jeremy Lindsay Taylor as Oscar Taylor 
 Craig McLachlan as Kyle Hampton 
 Dan Spielman as Rhys Callahan 
 Ben Oxenbould as Chris Toohey 
 Simon Burke as Simon Mawbrey
 Fletcher Humphrys as Brett Odonoahue 
 Mitchell Butel as Thomas Katz 
 John Brumpton as Eddie Mac 
 Caroline Brazier as Tina Toohey 
 Geoff Morrell as Don Lustigman
 Victoria Haralabidou as Anna Rexhaj
 Simon Elrahi
 George H. Xanthis
 Renee Lim
 Nathan Lovejoy
 Julian Maroun as Haris and Amar Rexhaj
 Josh Lev
 Kevin Godfrey
 Craig Michell

References

External links
 
  at Special Broadcasting Service, Australia

2016 Australian television series debuts
2010s Australian crime television series
2010s Australian drama television series
2010s Australian television miniseries
2010s crime drama television series
2010s LGBT-related drama television series
2010s mystery television series
Australian LGBT-related television shows
English-language television shows
Gay-related television shows
Murder in television
Special Broadcasting Service original programming
Television shows set in Sydney